Galmoy is a village in the barony of Galmoy, County Kilkenny in the southeastern part of the midlands of Ireland.

The town lends its name to Galmoy Mine, a zinc and lead mine.

In 2002, the village had 283 residents.

See also
List of towns and villages in Ireland

References

Towns and villages in County Kilkenny